Stiborius is a lunar impact crater that lies to the south-southwest of the crater Piccolomini, in the southeastern quadrant of the Moon's near side. To the south-southwest of Stiborius is the smaller Wöhler. Stiborius is 44 kilometers in diameter and 3.7 kilometers deep.

The rim of this crater is well-defined with little appearance of erosion. It is roughly circular in form, but has a prominent outward bulge to the northeast where the side has slumped into the interior. There is a terrace-like shelf along the southeastern and northern inner walls. The interior floor is somewhat irregular, and there is a low central peak at the midpoint that is connected to the northeastern wall by a low ridge. It is from the Upper Imbrian period, 3.8 to 3.2 billion years ago.
It is named after Andreas Stöberl, a 15th-century philosopher, theologian, and astronomer.

Satellite craters

By convention these features are identified on lunar maps by placing the letter on the side of the crater midpoint that is closest to Stiborius.

References

External links

Impact craters on the Moon
Imbrian